Lake County is a county in the U.S. state of Minnesota. As of the 2020 census, the population was 10,905. Its county seat is Two Harbors.

History
Prior to the arrival of Europeans, the area had long been inhabited by Native American groups. At the time of European contact, the principal Native American groups in the region were the Dakota (Sioux) and Ojibwe (also called Anishinabe or Chippewa). The economy of these groups was based on hunting, fishing and gathering, with wild rice being of particular importance. The first Europeans to explore the area were the French in the late 17th century who were followed by trappers, fur traders, missionaries, and explorers.

The Wisconsin Territory was established by the Federal Government effective July 3, 1836, and existed until its eastern portion was granted statehood (as Wisconsin) in 1848. Therefore, the Federal Government set up the Minnesota Territory effective March 3, 1849. The newly organized territorial legislature created nine counties across the territory in October of that year. One of those original counties, Itasca, had its eastern section partitioned off on February 20, 1855 into two new counties: the western part was designated Newton and the eastern part was named Superior County. The territorial legislature returned to the matter on March 3, changing Superior County to Saint Louis County. Then on March 1, 1856, the county name was again changed, to Lake County, and the "Saint Louis County" name was given to the previous Newton County. With the new name came the designation of county seat at Beaver Bay, which had first been platted in 1856. The county's boundaries were altered in 1874, when its eastern part was partitioned off to create Cook County.

In 1868, iron ore was discovered on the Vermilion Range by George Stuntz. A spur of the Duluth and Iron Range Railroad was extended to the Lake Superior shore, and a settlement quickly sprang up at the terminus. This settlement was incorporated as a village (Two Harbors) on March 9, 1888, and that same year a vote was taken to transfer the county seat from Beaver Bay to Two Harbors (1888).

Commercial fishing on Lake Superior became important during the late 1880s, spurred by the arrival of Swedish and Norwegian immigrants to the North Shore. In 1890, the Merritt brothers discovered the Mesabi Range. The Two Harbors Lighthouse was built on Agate Bay in 1892. Ten years later, five Two Harbors businessmen signed the articles of incorporation for a new mining company named 3M. Today, 3M Corporation has over 70,000 employees worldwide and produces more than 50,000 adhesive household products, now has its headquarters in Saint Paul.

In 1906, the Court House, which stands to this day, was built. In 1907, one of the nation's first steel ore docks was built in Two Harbors. In 1944, one of the first HMOs in the United States was created in Lake County to serve railroad employees.  A second iron ore boom took place in the 1950s with the development of the taconite beneficiation process for turning lean, low-grade iron ore into a shippable product.

In 2021, the Greenwood Fire burned over 10,500 acres of the county southwest of Isabella, beginning near Greenwood Lake.

Geography
Lake County lies on the north side of Minnesota. Its north border abuts the south border of the province of Ontario, Canada, and its south border is formed by Lake Superior. Its terrain consists of rolling mountains and hills, heavily wooded, and dotted with lakes and ponds. The terrain slopes both ways from a crestline that runs from its northeast line to its southwest line; the county's highest point is Stony Tower Hill at 2,301' ASL. It is the fifth-largest county in Minnesota by area.

Lake County is located in the Arrowhead Region of Northeastern Minnesota.

Major highways

  Minnesota State Highway 1
  Minnesota State Highway 61
  Minnesota State Highway 169
 List of county roads

Adjacent counties

 Rainy River District, Ontario - north
 Cook County - east
 Ashland County, Wisconsin - southeast (across Lake Superior)
 Bayfield County, Wisconsin - south (across Lake Superior)
 Douglas County, Wisconsin - south (across Lake Superior)
 Saint Louis County - west

Protected areas

 Finland State Forest
 George H. Crosby Manitou State Park
 Gooseberry Falls State Park
 Sand Lake Peatland Scientific and Natural Area
 Split Rock Lighthouse State Park
 Superior National Forest (part)
 Boundary Waters Canoe Area Wilderness (part)
 Tettegouche State Park

Demographics

2000 census
As of the 2000 census, there were 11,058 people, 4,646 households, and 3,140 families in the county. The population density was 5.24/sqmi (2.02/km2). There were 6,840 housing units at an average density of 3.24/sqmi (1.25/km2). The racial makeup of the county was 97.99% White, 0.10% Black or African American, 0.70% Native American, 0.18% Asian, 0.01% Pacific Islander, 0.14% from other races, and 0.88% from two or more races.  0.57% of the population were Hispanic or Latino of any race. 22.3% were of Norwegian, 17.8% German, 14.3% Swedish, 8.4% Finnish, 6.3% Irish and 5.4% English ancestry.

There were 4,646 households, out of which 27.10% had children under the age of 18 living with them, 57.80% were married couples living together, 6.60% had a female householder with no husband present, and 32.40% were non-families. 28.00% of all households were made up of individuals, and 12.70% had someone living alone who was 65 years of age or older.  The average household size was 2.32 and the average family size was 2.83.

The county population contained 22.30% under the age of 18, 6.60% from 18 to 24, 24.50% from 25 to 44, 26.70% from 45 to 64, and 20.00% who were 65 years of age or older. The median age was 43 years. For every 100 females there were 99.70 males. For every 100 females age 18 and over, there were 99.60 males.

The median income for a household in the county was $40,402, and the median income for a family was $46,980. Males had a median income of $39,719 versus $26,500 for females. The per capita income for the county was $19,761.  About 5.50% of families and 7.40% of the population were below the poverty line, including 9.40% of those under age 18 and 5.70% of those age 65 or over.

2020 Census

Government and politics
Lake County has a historic Democratic/Labor lean. It was the top county for Socialist Party of America candidate Eugene V. Debs in 1908, 1912, and 1920. The last Republican to carry the county was Herbert Hoover in his failed run for re-election in 1932 against Franklin D. Roosevelt, although in the 1932 election Socialist Norman Thomas received 19.32% of the county’s vote, one of the highest percentages in the country. Ironically, Lake County was the only county in Minnesota to vote for Hoover in 1932, despite going on to give Roosevelt his largest percentage in the state in 1936 and continue to vote staunchly Democratic in every election since. In 2016, Lake County was the whitest county in the entire country to vote for Democrat Hillary Clinton over Republican Donald Trump. Trump, however, got the highest percentage of the vote of any Republican since 1928.

Communities

Cities
 Beaver Bay
 Silver Bay
 Two Harbors (county seat)

Census-designated place
 Finland

Unincorporated communities

 Alger
 Castle Danger
 Cramer
 East Beaver Bay
 Highland (Marcy)
 Illgen City
 Isabella
 Knife River
 Larsmont
 Lax Lake
 Little Marais
 McNair
 Murphy City
 Sawbill Landing
 Section Thirty
 Silver Creek
 Stewart
 Toimi
 Waldo
 Wales

Ghost towns

 Avon
 Avoy
 Beaver
 Britton
 Buell
 Case
 Clark
 Crystal
 Darby Junction
 Drummond
 Eclfo
 Emetta
 Fernburg Tower
 Forest Center
 Freedom
 Green
 Greenwood Junction
 Howlett
 Jordan
 Kent
 London
 Malmota (Marmata)
 Maple
 Marble Lake
 Moose
 Morris
 Murfin
 Nigadoo
 Norshore Junction
 North Branch
 Riblet
 Scott Junction
 Silver
 Splitrock
 Stafford
 Summit
 Swift
 Thomas
 Wanless
 Westover
 Whyte
 Wolf
 York

Townships

 Beaver Bay Township
 Crystal Bay Township
 Fall Lake Township
 Silver Creek Township
 Stony River Township

Unorganized territories
 Lake No. 1
 Lake No. 2

See also
 National Register of Historic Places listings in Lake County, Minnesota

References

External links
 County website
 Lake County Visitor Information Website
 Mn/DOT – maps of Lake County (Southern portion, Central portion, Northern portion)

 
Minnesota counties
1856 establishments in Minnesota Territory
Populated places established in 1856